Mimalblymoroides is a genus of longhorn beetles of the subfamily Lamiinae, which contains the following species:

 Mimalblymoroides freudei Breuning, 1973
 Mimalblymoroides heinrichi Breuning, 1973
 Mimalblymoroides kaszabi (Breuning, 1969)
 Mimalblymoroides spinipennis (Breuning, 1970)

References

Desmiphorini